Sangar is an urban locality (an urban-type settlement) and the administrative center of Kobyaysky District of the Sakha Republic, Russia.  As of the 2010 Census, its population was 4,377.

Geography
Sangar is located on the right bank of the Lena River, on the opposite bank of the mouth of the Tyugyuene,  by road from Yakutsk, the capital of the republic.

History
It was established in 1928 as a mining settlement. The name originates from the nearby Sangar-Khaya Mountain. On February 10, 1930, the Yakut Autonomous Soviet Socialist Republic was split into districts (uluses) and Sangar became a part of newly established Namsky District. In 1934, the mine was transferred to the Chief Directorate of the Northern Sea Route, which at the time administrated most of the industrial activity in the north of the Soviet Union. Coal from Sangar was transported to Tiksi on the coast of the Arctic Ocean and there distributed among various Arctic settlements. On April 20, 1937, Kobyaysky District was established, with the administrative center in the selo of Kobyay, and Sangar became a part of that district.

In 1938, the reconstruction of Sangar, which until that year did not have a hospital or a club, started. Urban-type settlement status was granted to it in 1940. In 1942, about two hundred of people were deported to exile to Sangar from Leningrad Oblast. In June 1943, a fatal accident occurred in the mine, and twenty-two miners were killed. In 1956, gas was discovered in the district, and the economy of Sangar started to reorient to gas production and transport. In 1959, the administrative center of the district was moved to Sangar. The mine eventually decayed and in the 1960s was transferred to the local authorities, finally closing down in 1997. Since the mine was providing most of the jobs, more than a half of the population of Sangar migrated and the infrastructure was considerably reduced.

Administrative and municipal status
Within the framework of administrative divisions, the urban-type settlement of Sangar serves as the administrative center of Kobyaysky District. As an administrative division, it is, together with two rural localities, incorporated within Kobyaysky District as the Settlement of Sangar. As a municipal division, the Settlement of Sangar is incorporated within Kobyaysky Municipal District as Sangar Urban Settlement.

Economy

Industry
The coal mine was closed down in 1997.

Transportation
There are no all-season roads, and land connections to Yakutsk are only possible during winter along a winter road (zimnik).

The Lena River is navigable.

Sangar has an airport which provides the only regular all-year-round means of transportation.

References

Notes

Sources
Official website of the Sakha Republic. Registry of the Administrative-Territorial Divisions of the Sakha Republic. Kobyaysky District.

Further reading

External links
Unofficial website of Sangar 
Another unofficial website of Sangar 

Urban-type settlements in the Sakha Republic
Populated places on the Lena River